The J. V. Johnson House is a historic house at 36 Riverview Avenue in Swansea, Massachusetts.  This 1-1/2 Craftsman bungalow is locally distinctive for its use of stone as a building material and tile as a roofing material.  It has the wide eaves and low-slung dormers characteristic of that style, as well as decorative terra cotta wall panels.  Its designer is unknown; it was built in 1913 by Albert Leeming, a local contractor.  Its first owner was a businessman who owned a local beverage maker, the Cliquot Club Soda Company.

The house was listed on the National Register of Historic Places in 1990.

See also
National Register of Historic Places listings in Bristol County, Massachusetts

References

Houses in Bristol County, Massachusetts
Swansea, Massachusetts
Houses on the National Register of Historic Places in Bristol County, Massachusetts
Houses completed in 1913